François-Marie-Anatole de Rovérié de Cabrières (30 August 1830 – 21 December 1921) was a French Cardinal of the Roman Catholic Church. He served as Bishop of Montpellier from 1874 until his death, and was elevated to the cardinalate in 1911.

Biography
François de Rovérié de Cabrières was born in Beaucaire, and studied at College of the Assumption in Nîmes, and the Seminary of Saint-Sulpice in Paris.

He was ordained to the priesthood on 24 September 1853 and then did pastoral work in Nîmes until 1874, serving as director of the Minor Seminary of Nîmes and of Collège de l'Assomption (1855-1859), and private secretary to Bishop Claude-Henri Plantier. He was also made a cathedral canon on 5 January 1871, and later honorary vicar general.

On 16 January 1874, Rovérié was appointed Bishop of Montpellier by Pope Pius IX. He received his episcopal consecration on the following 19 March from Bishop Plantier, with Bishops Julien Meirireu and Gaspard Mermillod serving as co-consecrators. Rovérié was granted the right to wear the pallium, traditionally reserved for metropolitan bishops, on 15 July 1890.

Pope Pius X created him Cardinal-Priest of S. Maria della Vittoria in the consistory of 27 November 1911. Rovérié was one of the cardinal electors who participated in the 1914 papal conclave, which selected Pope Benedict XV.

Cardinal Rovérié died in Montpellier, at the age of 91. He is buried in the cathedral of Montpellier.

References

External links
 
Cardinals of the Holy Roman Church
Catholic-Hierarchy 

1830 births
1921 deaths
20th-century French cardinals
Bishops of Montpellier
19th-century French cardinals
Cardinals created by Pope Pius X